Citizens for Health is a U.S. non-profit organization which advocates on issues affecting nutrition, obesity, dietary supplements, food labeling and other health matters.

Organization
Citizens for Health (CFH) was founded in 1992.  As part of its advocacy, the group testifies to the U.S. Congress and the Food and Drug Administration about health and nutrition issues.  The group is headed by James L. Turner, a principal with the Washington law firm Swankin and Turner, and is supported by other key leadership members.

CFH has formulated a "food identity theft" website, which "alerts consumers about misleading food and beverage packaging and deceptive advertising."

Issue advocacy
In 1993, the group deluged lawmakers in Congress with letters objecting to efforts by the FDA to regulate labeling for nutritional supplements.  "For decades, the FDA has attempted to limit free speech and access to supplements by seizing products, raiding health clinics and insisting that the dissemination of information is tantamount to practicing medicine without a license," said the group's spokeswoman.

In 2006, the group filed a petition with the FDA asking that agency to withdraw its approval of Splenda, a sugar substitute.  The group cited concerns over possible side effects, including stomach pains and other digestion problems.

The group has also weighed in on the potential health effects from electromagnetic fields.

In 2013, CFH cited a study that obesity rates increased in recent decades, and blamed high fructose corn syrup as a primary cause, noting sugar consumption had declined during the same period.  CFH advocates frequently against the use of corn starch in food.

Controversy
Over the years, critics have charged that the group is a front for the sugar industry, attacking its business competitors under the umbrella of health without disclosing its ties to sugar.  According to an article published in August 2012, the group had received more than half its funding in the year prior from The Sugar Association.  The chairman of Citizens for Health said in an interview that the money from the sugar industry had been used to tell consumers that corn syrup isn't sugar.  He acknowledged that while the organization has said it takes money from business groups, it could have done more to disclose its ties to the sugar industry.  "We will make it clear as we go forward", he said.

In August 2013, a CFH news release stated that it is funded by "concerned consumers, non-profit partners, food growers, and businesses," and provides supporters with ways to access healthy food, non-toxic products, "and truthful, non-misleading health information."  However, the group did not disclose which food growers or businesses were funding the organization.

See also
Sugar
Public relations of high fructose corn syrup
Diet and obesity/Sugar consumption

References

External links
 Citizens for Health website

Non-profit organizations based in Washington, D.C.
Organizations established in 1992
1992 establishments in Washington, D.C.